14 + 14, also spelled 14 plus 14, is a CD and DVD greatest hits album by bachata group Aventura. It contains the songs and music videos from five studio albums and from the live album K.O.B. Live. Every song that has had a music video is on this album, with the exception of "All Up 2 You" which featured Akon and Wisin & Yandel.

Tacklist

Charts

Weekly charts

Year-end charts

References

External links
Aventura official site

2011 greatest hits albums
Aventura (band) compilation albums